The Boston College Eagles were represented Boston College in Women's Hockey East Association play during the 2015–16 NCAA Division I women's ice hockey season. The Eagles qualified for the NCAA Frozen Four, losing the championship game to Minnesota 3-1. Their only loss of the year came in the NCAA Championship game on March 20, 2016 against the University of Minnesota.  They had the second best winning percentage in NCAA Women's Hockey history with a mark of .976

Offseason
August 17: Five members of the Eagles roster were invited to participate at the 2015 USA Hockey Women’s National Festival in Lake Placid, New York. Patty Kazmaier Award winner Alex Carpenter was joined by Kali Flanagan, Haley Skarupa, Dana Trivigno and Megan Keller.

Recruiting

Roster

2015–16 Eagles

Schedule

|-
!colspan=12 style=""| Regular Season

|-
!colspan=12 style=""| WHEA Tournament

|-
!colspan=12 style=""| NCAA Tournament

Awards and honors

Makenna Newkirk, Hockey East Rookie of the Year
Katie King-Crowley, NCAA Coach of the Year, WHEA Coach of the Year (3rd consecutive)
Katie Burt, WHEA Goaltending Champion

Hockey East All-Stars
Alexandra Carpenter (Forward), 2015-16 Hockey East First Team All-Star
Megan Keller (Defender), Hockey East First Team All-Star
Lexi Bender (Defender), Hockey East First Team All-Star
Haley Skarupa (Forward), Hockey East First Team All-Star
Makenna Newkirk (Forward), Hockey East Pro-Ambitions All-Rookie Team
Katie Burt (Goaltender), Hockey East All-Star Honorable Mention
Dana Trivigno (Forward), Hockey East All-Star Honorable Mention

Miscellaneous

The 2015-16 BC Eagles were the second NCAA women's hockey team to record 40 wins in a single season.
The team competed in their first NCAA National Championship game
They set the all-time Hockey East Women's record for single season goals, with 114.
Alex Carpenter (51 points) and Haley Skarupa (49 points) had their best Hockey East scoring seasons.  Both women placed in the top five all-time single season point scorers.
Katie Burt led Hockey East in all major goaltending statistics.

References

Boston College
Boston College Eagles women's ice hockey seasons
NCAA women's ice hockey Frozen Four seasons
Boston College Eagles women's ice hockey season
Boston College Eagles women's ice hockey season
Boston College Eagles women's ice hockey season
Boston College Eagles women's ice hockey season